Emil Tot Wikström (born 10 October 1999) is a Swedish football midfielder who plays for Halmstads BK.

References

1999 births
Living people
Swedish footballers
Association football midfielders
Halmstads BK players
Superettan players
Allsvenskan players